Monique de Wilt (born 31 March 1976, in 's-Hertogenbosch) is a former Dutch athlete, specializing in the pole vault. She is a 14-time national champion in that event. She won the silver medal at the 1999 Summer Universiade.

Her outdoor personal best is 4.40 meters, achieved in 2002, while her indoor best is 4.45 meters from 2003. In 2015 both Dutch national records were broken by Femke Pluim.

Competition record

References

1976 births
Living people
Dutch female pole vaulters
Sportspeople from 's-Hertogenbosch
Universiade medalists in athletics (track and field)
Universiade silver medalists for the Netherlands
Medalists at the 1999 Summer Universiade